The International Pepper Community (IPC) is an intergovernmental organisation of pepper or peppercorn producing countries.

The International Pepper Community was established In Bangkok on 16 April 1971, the Agreement establishing the International Pepper Community was concluded. After this treaty came into force on 29 March 1972, the IPC was created. IPC headquarters are located in Jakarta, Indonesia.

Six states have ratified the IPC Agreement and are thus full members of the IPC: Brazil (since 1981), India (1972), Indonesia (1972), Malaysia (1972), Sri Lanka (2002), and Vietnam (2005). Papua New Guinea and Philippines have not ratified the Agreement but have been admitted to the IPC as an associate member.

See also
International Pepper Exchange

References

External links
International Pepper Community: official website
Ratifications of IPC Agreement, un.org

Organizations based in Jakarta
Organizations established in 1972
1972 establishments in Indonesia
1971 in Thailand
Intergovernmental organizations established by treaty
Pepper trade
Pepper
Food- and drink-related organizations